Genting Skyway is a gondola lift connecting Gohtong Jaya and Resort Hotel in Genting Highlands, Selangor, Malaysia.

The Genting Skyway is one of the two aerial lines serving Genting Highlands, serving as an alternate route since August 2016 when the new Awana Skyway is closed for maintenance. The mono cable gondola lift was officially opened by the fourth Prime Minister of Malaysia, Tun Dr Mahathir on 21 February 1997. 

Genting Skyway can carry more than 2,000 people per hour with 8 passengers per gondola. At the maximum speed of 6 metres per second (21.6 km/h), the  journey up the mountain peak takes approximately 15 minutes, depending on the weather. The system was designed by Leitner Ropeways.

The 2 x 640 kW power of the main drive and the 54 mm diameter solid cable wire is among the most powerful and strongest monocable gondola installation in the world. The system, equipped with high-tech electronic equipment, was built in accordance with stringent Swiss regulations and it has a double safety circuit completely independent.

The foundation used for the pylons is of the "Hang-dug Caisson" type. Each pylon is founded on four Caissons measuring 1.2 metres in diameter, socketed down to bedrock. The average depth of the Caissons is about 40 m (135 feet) and each group of four Caissons piles can take a vertical load of 4,000 tonnes against the maximum vertical load of 150 tonnes from the cable car system. The Caissons method is about the safest and strongest foundation in existence, designed specifically for hilly terrain. Each pylon is accessible via rescue tracks on the ground, whilst each gondola is equipped with radio communication equipment from the stations.

Gallery

See also
 Awana Skyway - Gondola lift type
 Langkawi Cable Car - Gondola lift type
 Penang Hill Railway - Funicular type
 Rail transport in Malaysia

References

External links 

 Leitner News April 2007
 Genting Skyway technical summary

1997 establishments in Malaysia
Genting Highlands
Gondola lifts in Malaysia